Agia Eirini or Agia Irini is a village located in Nicosia District, approximately 5 km east of Kakopetria in the Troodos mountains.

Communities in Nicosia District